La Serpentine (3,789 m) is a mountain of the Swiss Pennine Alps, located south of Arolla in the canton of Valais. It lies west of the Pigne d'Arolla, on the range between the valley of Bagnes and the valley of Arolla.

References

External links
 La Serpentine on Hikr

Mountains of Switzerland
Mountains of the Alps
Mountains of Valais